Juliana Moechtar (born 1 May 1989) is an Indonesian film actress and model. She began her career as a model in 2005 before pursuing her career in acting. She also emerged as one of the finalists at the 2010 Princess Indonesia event. Juliana also modelled for Indonesian TV channels including Trans TV.

She married Seventeen's popular guitarist Herman Sikumbang in 2012. Her spouse Herman Sikumbang died on 22 December 2018 at the age of 36 during the 2018 Sunda Strait tsunami which was triggered by volcanic eruption as the Seventeen band performed onstage near the Tanjung Lesung shore.

References 

1989 births
Living people
Indonesian film actresses
Indonesian female models
21st-century Indonesian actresses
People from Aceh
Actresses from Jakarta
Indonesian Christians